This is a list of buildings and structures in the Falkland Islands designated as being of architectural or historic interest, updated per 19 January 2006.

References

External links 
Historic Buildings Committee Falkland Islands Government Environmental Planning Department

Buildings and structures in the Falkland Islands
Falkland Islands-related lists
History of the Falkland Islands